The Convention on Fishing and Conservation of Living Resources of the High Seas is an agreement that was designed to solve through international cooperation the problems involved in the conservation of living resources of the high seas, considering that because of the development of modern technology some of these resources are in danger of being overexploited. The convention opened for signature on 29 April 1958 and entered into force on 20 March 1966.

Participation 
Parties – (39): Australia, Belgium, Bosnia and Herzegovina, Burkina Faso, Cambodia, Colombia, Republic of the Congo, Denmark, Dominican Republic, Fiji, Finland, France, Haiti, Jamaica, Kenya, Lesotho, Madagascar, Malawi, Malaysia, Mauritius, Mexico, Montenegro, Netherlands, Nigeria, Portugal, Senegal, Serbia, Sierra Leone, Solomon Islands, South Africa, Spain, Switzerland, Thailand, Tonga, Trinidad and Tobago, Uganda, United Kingdom, United States, Venezuela.

Countries that have signed, but not yet ratified – (21): Afghanistan, Argentina, Bolivia, Canada, Costa Rica, Cuba, Ghana, Iceland, Indonesia, Iran, Ireland, Israel, Lebanon, Liberia, Nepal, New Zealand, Pakistan, Panama, Sri Lanka, Tunisia, Uruguay.

See also
Environmental effects of fishing
United Nations Convention on the Law of the Sea
Convention on the High Seas

References

 CIA World Factbook,  edition
 Indonesian Law #19/1961

External links
 Indonesian Law #19/1961
 Convention of the High Seas (1958) 
 Convention on Fishing and Conservation of Living Resources of the High Seas (1958)

Environmental treaties
Fisheries law
Treaties concluded in 1958
Treaties entered into force in 1966
1966 in the environment
Treaties of Australia
Treaties of Belgium
Treaties of Bosnia and Herzegovina
Treaties of Burkina Faso
Treaties of the Kingdom of Cambodia (1953–1970)
Treaties of Colombia
Treaties of the Republic of the Congo
Treaties of Denmark
Treaties of the Dominican Republic
Treaties of Fiji
Treaties of Finland
Treaties of France
Treaties of Haiti
Treaties of Indonesia
Treaties of Jamaica
Treaties of Kenya
Treaties of Lesotho
Treaties of Madagascar
Treaties of Malawi
Treaties of Malaysia
Treaties of Mauritius
Treaties of Mexico
Treaties of the Netherlands
Treaties of Nigeria
Treaties of the Estado Novo (Portugal)
Treaties of Senegal
Treaties of Serbia and Montenegro
Treaties of Sierra Leone
Treaties of the Solomon Islands
Treaties of South Africa
Treaties of Francoist Spain
Treaties of Switzerland
Treaties of Thailand
Treaties of Tonga
Treaties of Trinidad and Tobago
Treaties of Uganda
Treaties of the United Kingdom
Treaties of the United States
Treaties of Venezuela
Treaties of Yugoslavia
Fisheries treaties
Fish conservation
Treaties extended to the Netherlands Antilles
Treaties extended to Aruba
Treaties extended to Saint Christopher-Nevis-Anguilla
Treaties extended to Bermuda
Treaties extended to the British Virgin Islands
Treaties extended to the Cayman Islands
Treaties extended to the Falkland Islands
Treaties extended to Gibraltar
Treaties extended to Montserrat
Treaties extended to the Pitcairn Islands
Treaties extended to Saint Helena, Ascension and Tristan da Cunha
Treaties extended to South Georgia and the South Sandwich Islands
Treaties extended to the Turks and Caicos Islands
Treaties extended to Surinam (Dutch colony)
Treaties extended to the Faroe Islands
Treaties extended to Greenland
United Nations treaties